Damir Zinyurovich Khayretdinov (Russian: Дами́р Зиню́рович Хайретди́нов) (born 1972) is a Russian historian, ethnographer and social activist. He is known for his  work documenting and studying the indigenous cultures and languages of Russian Tatars. He serves as a rector of Moscow Islamic University and is the consultant of mufti on the Clerical Muslim Board of the Russian Federation.

Personal life 
Damir was born In 1972 in Moscow. He graduated from the Russian State University for the Humanities. He received a grade of 'excellent' for the defense of his thesis "The spread of Islam among the Russian Tatars during the second half of 1980 - first half of the 1990". In 2002 he received his Ph.D. from the Institute of Anthropology and Ethnography on the theme: "The history of the Muslim community during the period from the 14th to the 20th century". (His supervisor was Alexeï Malachenko, a member of the Scientific Council of The Carnegie Moscow Center

Works 
 The spread of Islam among the Russian Tatars during the 2nd half of 1980 - 1st half of the 1990.
 The history of the Muslim community during the period from the 14th to the 20th century.

External links
 Moscow Islamic University web-site (Rus)
 Khayretdinov, Damir Zinyurovich (Rus)
 Moscow to Prepare Russian-Speaking Mullahs for Kazakhstan’s Muslims  (En)
 Russian State University for the Humanities web-site (Eng) 
 Institute of Anthropology and Ethnography (En)

References 

1972 births
Living people
Writers from Moscow
Tatar people of Russia
Russian Muslims
21st-century Russian historians
Russian ethnographers
Russian State University for the Humanities alumni